Universe is the second studio album of Swedish singer Mohombi, released in 2014, on Universal Music, following his debut album, MoveMeant, released in 2011. The first single, "Maraca", was released on 2 September 2011. The second single, "Movin'", featuring Birdman, Caskey and KMC, was released on 2 June 2014.

Track listing

References

2014 albums
Mohombi albums
Albums produced by Ilya Salmanzadeh